Golden West may refer to:

Places

 Rural Municipality of Golden West No. 95, Saskatchewan, Canada

Transportation
 Golden West Airlines, a defunct airline
 Golden West (clipper), an 1852 clipper ship in the California trade

Companies
 Golden West Broadcasters, a broadcasting company owned by Gene Autry
 Golden West Broadcasting, a Canadian radio broadcasting company
 Golden West Financial, a financial institution

Other
 Golden West College, a community college in Huntington Beach, California
 Golden West Network, the Seven Network affiliate in Western Australia
 The Golden West (1911 film), an Australian film
 The Golden West (1932 film), an American Western film
 Native Sons of the Golden West, a charitable organization which promotes California history
 La fanciulla del West (The Girl of the Golden West), a 1910 opera